John M. Dunham is a retired lawyer and ice hockey coach who previously led the men's program at Trinity College for 37 years.

Career
After graduating from the Taft School in 1960, Dunham began attending Brown University in the fall of 1960. After a year with the freshman team, he began playing for the varsity squad and helped the Bears produce winning records in his junior and senior seasons. Dunham graduated from Brown in 1965 with a degree in history and then matriculated to the University of Connecticut where he earned a JD in 1969.

Dunham was enticed back to hockey when Trinity College brought him in as the head coach for their club team. Four years later, Dunham was able to convince the school's administration to promote the program to varsity status. Dunham swiftly made the Bantams competitive in their conference but, beginning in 1980, the team flagged and moved into the middle of the pack. In 1985 he brought about a stark revival of the program and had the Bantams at the top of their league for the remainder of the decade.

In 1991, after 4 conference titles in 6 years, Dunham got his team to move from ECAC North/South, the conference with the lowest reputation at the Division III level, into ECAC East. Unsurprisingly, the change to a stronger league caused the Bantams' record to decline but the team slowly progressed throughout the 1990s. In 1999, the NESCAC, Trinity's primary conference, began sponsoring ice hockey with Trinity joining in the new conference. After a poor start, The Bantams became one of the top teams under Dunham's leadership and won the conference championship in 2003, earning them their first appearance in the NCAA Tournament. Two years later, the team made the Frozen Four.

Dunham retired as the team's coach in 2007, having led any of Trinity's athletic programs for the longest duration. In his retirement, Dunham couldn't stay inactive for long and began volunteering as a coach for Avon Old Farms, a College-preparatory school near his home in West Hartford, Connecticut. In 2011, Dunham agreed to serve as the interim head coach for Trinity after the sudden resignation of David Cataruzolo. He remained in charge for three months, allowing the school to bring in Matthew Greason as the program's third head coach just prior to the start of the season.

Dunham was inducted into the Brown Athletic Hall of Fame in 2011.

Head Coaching Record

See also
List of college men's ice hockey coaches with 400 wins

References

External links

Living people
American men's ice hockey goaltenders
Brown Bears men's ice hockey players
University of Connecticut alumni
Trinity College (Connecticut) faculty
Year of birth missing (living people)